Ger Oakley (born 1978 in Carrig, County Tipperary) is an Irish sportsperson.  He plays hurling with his local club Carrig and Riverstown and was a member of the Offaly senior inter-county team from 1997 to 2010.Oakley retired from Inter-County hurling in late 2010 to concentrate more on farming.

References

Teams

1978 births
Living people
Carrig and Riverstown hurlers
Offaly inter-county hurlers
Tipperary hurlers